Castelnuovo Bormida is a comune (municipality) in the Province of Alessandria in the Italian region Piedmont, located about  southeast of Turin and about  south of Alessandria.

Castelnuovo Bormida borders the following municipalities: Cassine, Rivalta Bormida, and Sezzadio.

Twin towns - Sister cities

Castelnuovo Bormida is twinned with:
 Łańcut, Poland

References

External links 
Castelnuovo Bormida di Beppe Bongiovanni History, legends, photos, curiosity about Castelnuovo Bormida

Cities and towns in Piedmont